Kulkija  ("The Wanderer") is the tenth studio album by Finnish folk metal band Korpiklaani. Released on 7 September 2018, it features themes like travelling, nostalgia and homesickness. It is the band's longest studio album at 71 minutes and 20 seconds, thus beating 2008's Korven Kuningas by almost a minute. The album reached the top 30 chart positions in Finland and Switzerland.

In 2019, the album was released in a special Tour Edition that features a bonus disc called Beer Beer, which is composed by various artists invited by the band to perform their song of the same name in different languages and versions.

Reception
Kulkija received positive reviews from critics, with praise going to the band for having updated its sound, flirting with genres like doom metal and acoustic while maintaining its classic essence with elements like drinking songs, although some felt the album was not as strong as their previous release, Noita.

Track listing

Charts

Personnel
 Jonne Järvelä – vocals, acoustic guitar, mandolin, percussion, violaphone
 Kalle "Cane" Savijärvi – guitar, backing vocals
 Jarkko Aaltonen – bass
 Matti "Matson" Johansson – drums
 Sami Perttula – accordion
 Tuomas Rounakari – violin

References

Korpiklaani albums
2018 albums
Nuclear Blast albums